The Arbee was a short-lived English automobile manufactured in 1904 by Rodgers Brothers, New Kent Road, London; the 6hp two-speed vehicle was advertised as having a "slow-running engine".

See also
 List of car manufacturers of the United Kingdom

Veteran vehicles
Defunct motor vehicle manufacturers of England
Vehicle manufacture in London